Meloidogyne gajuscus is a plant pathogenic nematode infecting African daisies.

See also 
 List of African daisy diseases

References 

Tylenchida
Plant pathogenic nematodes
Ornamental plant pathogens and diseases